Lebia nigripes is a species of ground beetles in the Harpalinae subfamily that can be found in southern part of Russia.

References

Lebia
Beetles described in 1871
Endemic fauna of Russia